Vladikavkaz is a railway station in Vladikavkaz, the capital of North Ossetia in Russia. The terminus station on the Beslan — Vladikavkaz line (Vladikavkaz Railway).

History
A railway between Vladikavkaz and Moscow exists since summer 1875.

First brick in building of the Vladikavkaz station was laid in 1875. In the first half of the 1960s the railway station and the adjacent territory were renovated. In the second half of the 2000s, the station was renovated and equipped with new equipment.

Trains
 Vladikavkaz — Mineralnye Vody
 Vladikavkaz — Moscow
 Vladikavkaz — St.Petersburg
 Vladikavkaz — Novorossiysk
 Vladikavkaz — Adler
 Vladikavkaz — Anapa

References

External links

 Russian Railways

Railway stations in North Ossetia–Alania
Vladikavkaz
Railway stations in the Russian Empire opened in 1875
Cultural heritage monuments in North Ossetia–Alania